The  is a police tactical unit maintained by individual Japanese prefectural police and supervised by the National Police Agency.

The SAT is a national-level counterterrorism unit that cooperates with territorial-level Anti-Firearms Squads and Counter-NBC Terrorism Squads. Most information on the unit has been confidential, its existence officially revealed only in 1996.

Background
Assault sections were later established in some urban squads; these squads were predecessors of the Anti-firearms squads, but they were only part-time SWAT teams at this time.

In response to the Dhaka Incident, the National Police Agency decided to set up full-time anti-terrorism special units at the Tokyo Metropolitan Police Department and the Osaka Prefectural Police Department in secret. The Tokyo unit was nicknamed SAP (Special Armed Police), and it was recognized as the official name around 1982 and the flag was awarded. Several SAP officers were sent to West Germany to be trained by GSG-9 operators due to their experience in resolving the hijacking of Lufthansa Flight 181. They were instructed on using MP5s, which they first used in the 1980s.

In 1996, it was officially announced that the tactical units had been organized, and their unit name were changed to SAT, Special Assault Teams. In addition to the MPD and Osaka teams, additional teams for the Hokkaido, Kanagawa, Chiba, Aichi, and Fukuoka Prefectural Police were also established. In 2005, a team of the Okinawa Prefectural Police was established, and existing units were also reinforced.

Organization

Structure 
SAT teams are set up at eight prefectural police agencies. In most prefectures they belong to the Riot Police Unit, but in the MPD it is directly under its First Security Division, and the Security Division in the Osaka.

Total strength is about 300 officers. It is said that three teams in the Metropolitan Police Department, two teams in the Osaka Prefectural Police Department, and one team in each of the other Prefectural Police are set up. Each team consists of a command section, an entry section, a sniper support section, and a technical support section.

Recruitment and training 
Members are recruited from Riot Police Units. When the unit was founded, the members were selected from rangers, rescue specialists, snipers and martial artists. It is said that they will be subject to inspection and inspection for officers under 30 years old. In order to maintain physical strength, the period of service is assumed to be approximately 5 years. Graduates are usually transferred to other departments in the Security Bureau, but some are transferred to the Special Investigation Team (SIT) of the criminal investigation department to introduce their SWAT-based tactics for the department.

Although SAT training is enigmatic, a retired SAP member recalled that Airborne Ranger Courses of the Japan Ground Self-Defense Force, counter-insurgency, and air assault training had been conducted. Nowadays, SAT has training facilities in six locations nationwide, and training at Yumenoshima is sometimes released to reporters. There were also exchanges with overseas police forces, at least with joint training with the German GSG 9. 10 SAT officers were placed under training by Queensland Police's Specialist Service Branch in Queensland, Australia.

The SAT does joint exercises with the SFGp. The SAT also conducted a joint training in 2014 with the Nucleo Operativo Centrale di Sicurezza.

Equipment

In addition to standard service handguns, the SAP units used Heckler & Koch P9S pistols as their main sidearms. After being reorganized into the SAT, usage of Heckler & Koch USP and Smith & Wesson Model 3913 have been confirmed, there is information that Glock 19, SIG Sauer P226 and Beretta 92 Vertec are adopted.

The SAT used Heckler & Koch MP5A5, MP5SD6, MP5K submachine guns. There is also information that SAT units have adopted Howa Type 89 assault rifles and M4 carbines.

The Howa Golden Bear, then M1500 as their sniper rifle. The Howa Type 64 rifle was also used as designated marksman rifles. Later on, the Heckler & Koch PSG1 and L96A1 also have been deployed.

SAT teams operate special  and unmarked bulletproof cars.

The first units stood up in the 1970s had its operators forced to initially purchase tactical equipment with their own money through mail-in ads in military magazines.

Operational history

The "Zero" Company of the Osaka Prefectural Police had its first known incident on January 26, 1979 when they were deployed during a Mitsubishi Bank hostage incident in Osaka. In the incident, they shot dead Akiyoshi Umekawa after he gunned down two employees and two policemen.

As the SWAT ability of other departments improved, the SAT became the "last ditch" of the Security Bureau of the National Police Agency, and opportunities to conduct direct domestic action decreased. In the Gulf Crisis of 1990, the SAP unit was dispatched to Saudi Arabia for non-combatant evacuation operation. During the Japanese embassy hostage crisis in Peru, the SAT had simulated raids on retaking buildings similar to the Japanese Embassy as a possible counter-measure to a similar incident on Japanese soil.

On June 21, 1995, All Nippon Airways Flight 857 was hijacked at the Hakodate Airport in Hokkaido by a lone hijacker named . This incident marked the first time that the Japanese Air Self-Defense Forces cooperated with the SAP by providing Kawasaki C-1 aircraft as means of transportation from Haneda Airport. SAP officers assisted Hokkaido Prefectural Police officers in storming the plane.

In May 2000, the Osaka and Fukuoka SAT assisted detectives of the Hiroshima Prefectural Police when they stormed a hijacked bus in Fukuoka in the Neomugicha incident, capturing the lone hijacker alive. Due to the self-defense requirements as stipulated in the Law Concerning Execution of Duties of Police Officials, it took more than 15 hours for the hostage crisis to end. Stun grenades were used in the operation.

In September 2003, the Aichi SAT unit was deployed to resolve a hostage incident. However, the hostage-taker  committed suicide in an explosion which killed three and injured 41 others.

On September 10, 2005, Okinawa was established for a SAT unit to be operational. According to the NPA, the presence of American troops and the region's geography were taken into consideration in creating a unit to be stationed there, especially after Al-Qaeda had made terrorist threats against Japan in the past.

In May 2007, in a hostage crisis case in Nagoya, an ex-yakuza gangster named  was captured after he killed , an Aichi SAT operative. Prior to shooting Hayashi, Obayashi shot a uniformed officer who was called in to respond to a domestic violence incident at 4 in the afternoon. The Aichi SIT was in charge with the Aichi SAT assisting, but the stray bullets hit the SAT operative. Hayashi, an inspector in the Aichi Prefectural Police, was the first SAT officer to be killed in action. His death forced National Public Safety Commission Chairman Kensei Mizote to issue a press report, stating that SAT equipment would be checked to see if it was responsible for Hayashi's death. The SAT Support Staff (SSS) was created in the wake of the hostage taking in Aichi Prefecture. They are in charge of coordinating with the prefectural police criminal investigation department, assisting the police chief and coordinating liaison with the National Police Agency Security Bureau.

On December 14, 2007, a shooting spree occurred at the Renaissance Sports Club in Sasebo, Nagasaki, when Masayoshi Magome used a shotgun to kill two persons and wound six others. The Nagasaki Prefectural Police Anti-Firearms Squad and Fukuoka SAT were sent in to intervene in the shooting.

On February 9, 2015, Japanese media suggested that the SAT can potentially be dispatched to work alongside officers from the Terrorism Response Team-Tactical Wing for Overseas. On December 22, 2015, TMPD and Kanagawa SAT units have conducted joint exercises in the wake of the upcoming G7 summit.

The SAT was deployed in May 2016 at the 42nd G7 summit, providing security alongside the Special Boarding Unit.

Notes

References

Books

Articles

External links

 Special Operations link 
 SpecWarNet link

Police tactical units
Police units of the Tokyo Metropolitan Police Department
Special forces of Japan